The 2010 Alabama Crimson Tide Baseball Team represented the University of Alabama in the NCAA Division I baseball season of 2010.

Synopsis 
Alabama (42-25, 15–15 SEC) began the season with an eight-game winning streak and matched the school record for the best record (16–1) after 17 games. Alabama then lost 14 of its next 20 games with a record of 22–15 by April 19. Alabama then won five straight games in late April, before losing six of eight games following a 5–4 loss to Mississippi on May 14. Alabama closed the regular season with five straight wins, qualifying .

During post-season play, Alabama participated in the 2010 Southeastern Conference baseball tournament (Alabama's 21st appearance) and the 2010 NCAA Division I baseball tournament. In the SEC tournament, Alabama won 3 games, defeating Auburn, Mississippi, and Florida, advancing to the finals where Alabama lost to LSU 4–3 in 11 innings. In the NCAA tournament, Alabama defeated Elon, Mercer, and Georgia Tech, advancing to the finals where Alabama lost to Clemson.

Personnel

2010 roster

Coaching Staff

Schedule/Results 

! style="background:#FFF;color:#8B0000;"|Regular Season
|- valign="top" 

|- align="center" bgcolor="#ccffcc"
| 1 || February 20 || South Alabama || Sewell-Thomas Stadium || 12–4 || A. Morgan (1–0) || J. Bailey (0–1) ||None || 4,848 || 1–0 || –
|- align="center" bgcolor="#ccffcc"
| 2 || February 21 || South Alabama || Stanky Field ||5-3 || T. White (1–0) || B. Brown (0–1)  || J. Smith (1)|| 3,273 || 2–0 ||–
|- align="center" bgcolor="#ccffcc"
| 3 || February 26 || Illinois-Chicago ||Sewell-Thomas Stadium  || 9–4 || N. Kilcrease (1–0) || C. Kovacevich (0–2) || None || 3,667 ||3–0 || –
|- align="center" bgcolor="#ccffcc"
| 4 || February 27 || Illinois-Chicago || Sewell-Thomas Stadium || 25–1 ||J. Nelson (1–0)  || E. Wyman (0–2) || None|| 4,577 || 4–0 ||–
|- align="center" bgcolor="#ccffcc"
| 5 || February 27 || Illinois-Chicago || Sewell-Thomas Stadium || 4–3 || B. Whitaker (1–0) || M. Heesch (0–1)|| None|| 4,577 || 5–0 ||–
|- align="center" bgcolor=""

|- align="center" bgcolor="bbbbbb"
| – || March 2 || Samford || Joe Lee Griffin Stadium  || colspan=7 |Postponed
|- align="center" bgcolor="#ccffcc"
| 6 || March 3† ||#25 Georgia || Regions Park || 13–2 || T. Wolfe (1–0) || C. Hawkins (0–1) ||None || 792 || 6–0 ||–
|- align="center" bgcolor="#ccffcc"
| 7 || March 5 || College of Charleston ||Patriots Point ||6-2  ||A. Morgan (2–0) || D. Peterson (1–1) ||B. Whitaker (1) ||  417|| 7–0 ||–
|- align="center" bgcolor="#ccffcc"
| 8 || March 6 ||College of Charleston ||Patriots Point || 4–0 || J. Nelson (2–0) || C. Powell (2–1) ||None || 768 ||8–0  ||–
|- align="center" bgcolor="#ffbbbb"
| 9 || March 7 ||College of Charleston ||Patriots Point|| 6–7 || T. Schiller (3–0) || J. Smith (0–1) || None||731|| 8–1 ||–
|- align="center" bgcolor="bbbbbb"
| – || March 9† || Auburn ||Riverwalk Stadium || colspan=7 |Postponed
|- align="center" bgcolor="bbbbbb"
| – || March 10 || Michigan State||Sewell-Thomas Stadium  || colspan=7 |Cancelled
|- align="center" bgcolor="#ccffcc"
| 10 || March 12 ||Stony Brook || Sewell-Thomas Stadium || 15–8 ||T. White (2–0)  || T. Johnson (1–1) ||None ||3,637  ||  9–1 ||–
|- align="center" bgcolor="#ccffcc"
| 11 || March 13 ||Stony Brook ||Sewell-Thomas Stadium || 5–0 || J. Nelson (3–0) || N. Tropeano (1–1)|| D. Head (1) ||3,623  || 10–1 ||–
|- align="center" bgcolor="#ccffcc"
| 12 || March 13 || Stony Brook|| Sewell-Thomas Stadium|| 13–6 || T. Wolfe (2–0) || M. Barbot (0–1) ||None || 3,623 || 11–1 ||–
|- align="center" bgcolor="#ccffcc"
| 13 || March 14 ||Stony Brook ||Sewell-Thomas Stadium || 4–3 || J. Smart (1–0) || A. Brown (0–2) || T. White (1) || 3,540 || 12–1 ||–
|- align="center" bgcolor="#ccffcc"
| 14 || March 16 ||Minnesota ||Sewell-Thomas Stadium || 5–4 || D. Head (1–0) || T. Ryan (0–1) || None||4,056  || 13–1 ||–
|- align="center" bgcolor="#ccffcc"
| 15 || March 17 ||Minnesota ||Sewell-Thomas Stadium || 9–4 || A. Windsor (1–0) || S. Fern (1–3) ||None || 4,044 || 14–1 ||–
|- align="center" bgcolor="#ccffcc"
| 16 || March 19 ||#19 Vanderbilt ||Sewell-Thomas Stadium ||4-1 ||A. Morgan (3–0) || S. Gray (3–2) || B. Whitaker (2) || 4,428|| 15–1 ||1–0
|- align="center" bgcolor="#ccffcc"
| 17 || March 20 ||#19 Vanderbilt ||Sewell-Thomas Stadium || 8–2 || J. Nelson (4–0) || T. Hill (3–1) ||None || 4,512 ||  16–1 ||2–0
|- align="center" bgcolor="#ffbbbb"
| 18 || March 21 ||#19 Vanderbilt ||Sewell-Thomas Stadium || 4–5 || J. Armstrong (3–0) || T. Wolfe (2–1) ||R. Brewer (3) || 3,541 ||  16–2 ||2–1
|- align="center" bgcolor="#ffbbbb"
| 19 || March 24† || Auburn ||Riverwalk Stadium || 6–8 || M. Hurst (2–0) || J. Smart (1–1) || A. Hubbard (3)|| 7,205 ||  16–3 ||–
|- align="center" bgcolor="#ffbbbb"
| 20 || March 26 ||#16 Arkansas || Baum Stadium || 8–9 || T. Forrest (3–0) || B. Whitaker (1–1) || D. Baxendale (6)|| 8,942 ||  16–4 ||2–2
|- align="center" bgcolor="#ffbbbb"
| 21 || March 27 ||#16 Arkansas||Baum Stadium || 3–4 || J. Pratt (1–0) || T. White (2–2) ||None || 8,332 ||  16–5 ||2–3
|- align="center" bgcolor="#ffbbbb"
| 22 || March 28 ||#16 Arkansas||Baum Stadium || 5–10 || T. Forrest (4–0) || A. Scott (0–1) || None||7,130  ||  16–6 ||2–4
|- align="center" bgcolor="#ccffcc"
| 23 || March 30 ||Jacksonville State  || Sewell-Thomas Stadium|| 7–3 || T. Pilkington (1–0) || K. Elwell (1–2) ||None ||3,760  || 17–6 ||–
|- align="center" bgcolor="#ffbbbb"
| 24 || March 31 ||UAB  ||Regions Park || 4–6 || B. Waite (1–0) || T. Hawley (0–1) ||N. Graffeo (3) || 2,281 ||  17–7 ||–
|-

|- align="center" bgcolor="#ccffcc"
| 25 || April 2 ||Auburn  ||Sewell-Thomas Stadium  ||10-5  || A. Morgan (4–0) || C. Luckie (1–2) ||None || 5,112 ||  18–7 ||3–4
|- align="center" bgcolor="#ccffcc"
| 26 || April 3 ||Auburn  ||Sewell-Thomas Stadium || 6–5 ||J. Townsend (1–0)  || A. Hubbard (2–1) || N. Kilcrease (1)|| 5,306 ||  19–7 ||4–4
|- align="center" bgcolor="#ffbbbb"
| 27 || April 4 ||Auburn ||Sewell-Thomas Stadium ||  1-7||  || T. Wolfe (2–1) || || 4,350 ||  19–8 ||4–5
|- align="center" bgcolor="#ffbbbb"
| 28 || April 6 ||UAB||Sewell-Thomas Stadium || 4–11 ||  || J. Townsend (1–1) || || 3,895 ||  19–9 ||–
|- align="center" bgcolor="#ccffcc"
| 29 || April 7 ||Jacksonville State || Rudy Abbott Field || 10–4 ||  ||  || || 3,392 || 20–9 ||–
|- align="center" bgcolor="#ffbbbb"
| 30 || April 9 ||Kentucky ||Cliff Hagan Stadium || 6–7 ||  ||  || || 2,179 ||  20–10||4–6
|- align="center" bgcolor="#ffbbbb"
| 31 || April 10 ||Kentucky||Cliff Hagan Stadium || 2–8 ||  ||  || || 2,098 ||  20–11||4–7
|- align="center" bgcolor="#ccffcc"
| 32 || April 11 ||Kentucky ||Cliff Hagan Stadium  || 11–9 ||  ||  || || 1,953 ||  21–11||5–7
|- align="center" bgcolor="#ffbbbb"
| 33 || April 13 ||Samford ||Sewell-Thomas Stadium || 5–7 ||  ||  || || 3,819 ||  21–12||–
|- align="center" bgcolor="#ccffcc"
| 34 || April 14 ||#23 SE Louisiana ||Pat Kennelly Diamond|| 10–5 || || || || 2,108|| 22–12||–
|- align="center" bgcolor="#ffbbbb"
| 35 || April 16 ||#6 LSU||Alex Box Stadium || 5–12 ||  ||  || || 11,332 || 22–13||5–8
|- align="center" bgcolor="#ffbbbb"
| 36 || April 17 ||#6 LSU ||Alex Box Stadium || 7–9 ||  ||  || || 12,313 ||  22–14||5–9
|- align="center" bgcolor="#ffbbbb"
| 37 || April 18 ||#6 LSU  ||Alex Box Stadium || 5–6 ||  ||  || || 10,744 ||  22–15||5–10
|- align="center" bgcolor="#ccffcc"
| 38 || April 23 ||Mississippi State ||Sewell-Thomas Stadium ||8-5  ||  ||  || || 4,037 ||  23–15||6–10
|- align="center" bgcolor="#ccffcc"
| 39 || April 24 || Mississippi State ||Sewell-Thomas Stadium || 9–8 ||  ||  || || 4,828 ||  24–15||7–10
|- align="center" bgcolor="#ccffcc"
| 40 || April 25 || Mississippi State||Sewell-Thomas Stadium || 6–4 ||  ||  || || 4,828 ||  25–15||8–10
|- align="center" bgcolor="#ccffcc"
| 41 || April 27 || Mississippi Valley State ||Sewell-Thomas Stadium || 7–4 ||  ||  ||3,404 ||  || 26–15||–
|- align="center" bgcolor="#ccffcc"
| 42 || April 28 ||Mississippi Valley State ||Sewell-Thomas Stadium || 5–1 ||  ||  || || 3,453 ||  27–15||–
|- align="center" bgcolor="#ffbbbb"
| 43 || April 30 ||#3 South Carolina||Carolina Stadium || 7–9 ||  ||  || || 8,145 ||  27–16||8–11
|-

|- align="center" bgcolor="#ccffcc"
| 44 || May 1 ||#3 South Carolina ||Carolina Stadium  || 6–4 ||  ||  || || 8,053 ||  28–16||9–11
|- align="center" bgcolor="#ffbbbb"
| 45 || May 2 ||#3 South Carolina ||Carolina Stadium || 15–20 ||  ||  || || 8,006 ||  28–17|9–12
|- align="center" bgcolor="#ffbbbb"
| 46 || May 7 ||#3 Florida || Sewell-Thomas Stadium|| 3–9 ||  ||  || || 4,387 ||  28–18||9–13
|- align="center" bgcolor="#ffbbbb"
| 47 || May 8 ||#3 Florida ||Sewell-Thomas Stadium || 8–14 ||  ||  || || 4,273 ||  28–19||10–13
|- align="center" bgcolor="#ccffcc"
| 48 || May 9 ||#3 Florida || Sewell-Thomas Stadium|| 10–8 ||  ||  || || 4,317 ||  29–19||10–14
|- align="center" bgcolor="#ffbbbb"
| 49 || May 12 || Samford || Joe Lee Griffin Stadium  ||7-8 || || || ||1,835 || 29–20||10–14
|- align="center" bgcolor="#ffbbbb"
| 50 || May 14 ||#14 Ole Miss ||Sewell-Thomas Stadium || 4–5 ||  ||  || || 4,039 ||  29–21||10–15
|- align="center" bgcolor="#ccffcc"
| 51 || May 15 ||#14 Ole Miss ||Sewell-Thomas Stadium || 4–1 ||  ||  || ||4,723  ||  30–21||11–15
|- align="center" bgcolor="#ccffcc"
| 52 || May 16 ||#14 Ole Miss ||Sewell-Thomas Stadium || 6–3 ||  ||  || || 4,034 ||  31–21||12–15
|- align="center" bgcolor="#ccffcc"
| 53 || May 20 || Tennessee||Lindsey Nelson Stadium || 11–3 ||  ||  || || 2,304 || 32–21||13–15
|- align="center" bgcolor="#ccffcc"
| 54 || May 21 || Tennessee||Lindsey Nelson Stadium || 4–2 ||  ||  || || 2,487 ||  33–21||14–15
|- align="center" bgcolor="#ccffcc"
| 55 || May 22 ||Tennessee||Lindsey Nelson Stadium || 9–7 ||  ||  || || 1,694 || 34–21||15–15
|-

|-
! style="background:#FFF;color:#8B0000;"| Post-Season
|-

|- align="center" bgcolor="#ccffcc"
| 56 || May 26 ||#13 Auburn  ||Regions Park || 7-1||J. Nelson (8–2) ||C. Luckie (6–4) ||None ||12,514 ||35-21  ||1-0
|-align="center" bgcolor="#ccffcc"
| 57 || May 27 ||Ole Miss  ||Regions Park || 6-3||N. Kilcrease (6–2) ||A. Barret (7–4) ||J. Smith (4) ||12,180||36-21  ||2-0
|-align="center" bgcolor="#ccffcc"
| 58 || May 29 ||#4 Florida  ||Regions Park || 5-2||A. Morgan (6–4) ||T. Toledo (3–2) ||None ||11,542 ||37-21  ||3-0
|-align="center" bgcolor="#ffbbb"
| 59 || May 30 ||LSU  ||Regions Park || 3–4 (11)||A. Ranaudo (5–2) ||J. Smith (1–2) ||None ||13,327 ||37-22  ||3-1
|-

|- align="center" bgcolor="#ccffcc"
| 60 || June 4 ||Elon  ||Russ Chandler Stadium || 11-2||N. Kilcrease (7–2) ||J. Reyes (10–4) ||None ||1,257 ||38-22  ||1-0
|-align="center" bgcolor="#ffbbb"
| 61 || June 5 ||#8 Georgia Tech  ||Russ Chandler Stadium || 2-5||D. McGuire (9–4) ||J. Nelson (8–3) ||A. Robinson (8) ||4,157||38-23  ||1-1
|-align="center" bgcolor="#ccffcc"
| 62 || June 6 ||Mercer  ||Russ Chandler Stadium || 5-3||T. Hawley (2–1) ||J. French (3–4) ||J. Smith (5) ||1,191 ||39-23  ||2-1
|-align="center" bgcolor="#ccffcc"
| 63 || June 6 ||#8 Georgia Tech  ||Russ Chandler Stadium || 8–1 ||A. Morgan (7–4) ||B. Cumpton (9–3) ||None ||2,187 ||40-23  ||3-1
|-align="center" bgcolor="#ccffcc"
| 64 || June 7 ||#8 Georgia Tech||Russ Chandler Stadium || 10–8 ||N. Kilcrease (8–2) ||J. Bradley (9–5) ||None ||3,113 ||41-23  ||4-1
|-

|- align="center" bgcolor="#ccffcc"
|  65|| June 12 ||#13 Clemson  ||Doug Kingsmore Stadium ||5-4 ||J. Nelson (9–3) ||C. Harman (7–3) ||J. Smith (6) ||6,346 ||42-23  ||5-1
|- align="center" bgcolor="#ffbbb"
|  66|| June 13 ||#13 Clemson  ||Doug Kingsmore Stadium ||5-19 || || || ||6,024 ||  42–24  ||5-2
|- align="center" bgcolor="#ffbbb"
|  67|| June 14 ||#16 Clemson  ||Doug Kingsmore Stadium ||6-8 || || || ||5,250 || 42–25  ||5-3
|-

† Indicates the game does not count toward the 2010 Southeastern Conference Standings.
*Rankings are based on the team's current ranking in the Baseball America poll the week Alabama faced each opponent.

Rankings 

 NR = Not Ranked
 ^ Collegiate Baseball ranked 40 teams in their preseason poll, but will only rank 30 teams weekly during the season.
 † NCBWA ranked 35 teams in their preseason poll, but will only rank 30 teams weekly during the season.

Awards and honors 
 Jake Smith
 2010 NCBWA Preseason All-American, Third Team
 2010 Louisville Slugger/Collegiate Baseball newspaper preseason All-America, Third Team
 2010 Ping Baseball Preseason All-American, Third Team
 Ross Wilson
 2010 NCBWA Preseason All-American, Second Team
 2010 Ping Baseball Preseason All-American, First Team
 2010 Baseball America preseason All-American, First Team

Alabama Crimson Tide in the 2010 MLB Draft 
The following members of the Alabama Crimson Tide baseball program were drafted in the 2010 MLB Draft.

See also 
 Alabama Crimson Tide baseball

References 

Alabama Crimson Tide Baseball Team, 2010
Alabama Crimson Tide baseball seasons
2010 in sports in Alabama
Alabama